Something's Changing is the third studio album by English musician Lucy Rose. It was released in July 2017 under Communion Music.

Track listing

Charts

References

2017 albums
Lucy Rose albums